Joaquín Enrique Valerio Olivera (born 12 January 1973) is a Spanish former footballer who played as a goalkeeper.

Club career
Born in Badalona, Barcelona, Catalonia, Valerio began playing with Real Madrid Castilla, Hércules CF – with whom he won the second division in 1996 – and Albacete Balompié. From 1997 to 2001 he represented Real Betis, playing 12 La Liga games (his first being on 1 November 1997 in a 2–3 home loss against Atlético Madrid, coming on as a substitute for Toni Prats who had been sent off in the 20th minute); the 2000–01 season was spent in the second level, as both Betis and Sevilla FC returned to the top flight.

After one campaign each in divisions three and two, with Elche CF and CD Tenerife respectively, Valerio moved in 2003 to UD Almería. In 2006–07 he appeared in four matches for the Andalusians, backing up first-choice Sander Westerveld as the club achieved a first-ever top tier promotion.

In summer 2007, aged 34, Valerio returned to Elche. After only one season, he joined third division side Polideportivo Ejido, being regularly used over three years and retiring in June 2011 at the age of 38.

References

External links

1973 births
Living people
People from Badalona
Sportspeople from the Province of Barcelona
Spanish footballers
Footballers from Catalonia
Association football goalkeepers
La Liga players
Segunda División players
Segunda División B players
CF Damm players
Real Madrid Castilla footballers
Hércules CF players
Albacete Balompié players
Real Betis players
Elche CF players
CD Tenerife players
UD Almería players
Polideportivo Ejido footballers